2008 Empress's Cup Final was the 30th final of the Empress's Cup competition. The final was played at National Stadium in Tokyo on January 1, 2009. Nippon TV Beleza won the championship.

Overview
Defending champion Nippon TV Beleza won their 9th title, by defeating INAC Leonessa 4–1 with Yayoi Kobayashi, Eriko Arakawa, Homare Sawa and Mana Iwabuchi goal. Nippon TV Beleza won the title for 2 years in a row.

Match details

See also
2008 Empress's Cup

References

Empress's Cup
2008 in Japanese women's football